British School Tripoli (BST) is a British international school in Tripoli, Libya. As of 2012 it raises its own finances and governs itself, not controlled by any other entity. As of 2012 Alistair Bond was the headmaster. The school served Foundation Stage through Year 9.

History
The British Embassy in Tripoli established the school in 1968. On 20 February 2011 the school was temporarily closed. On 22 February all of the school's teachers left Libya, in the wake of the 2011 Libyan Civil War. The teaching assistants and cleaning staff remained behind. By March of that year the school announced intentions to provide an online education programme in the meantime.

See also
 Libya–United Kingdom relations

References

External links
 British School Tripoli (Archive)

Educational institutions established in 1968
1968 establishments in Africa
International schools in Tripoli, Libya
Tripoli
Libya–United Kingdom relations